The Balboa Amusement Producing Company (also known as Balboa Studios) was a film production company in Long Beach, California, from 1913 to 1918 that produced more than 1000 films,  around 90% of which have been lost.

Some of the notable silent film stars who worked at the studios during this time are Fatty Arbuckle and Buster Keaton. Charlie Chaplin also made three visits to the studios to visit Arbuckle's film shoots and to study studio management for his newly formed United Artists company.

History 
In 1910, the California Motion Picture Manufacturing Company built the first movie studio in the city of Long Beach. This was also the first studio west of Chicago, since the hub of film-making at that time was in New York. In April 1913, H. M. Horkheimer (along with his brother, Elwood) invested their inheritance in the purchase of the studio built by the California Motion Picture Manufacturing Company at the corner of 6th Street and Alamitos Ave. This became the center of their Balboa Amusement Producing Company.

Jack London
A contract between Balboa and Jack London was signed on April 28, 1913, allowing the studio to make film adaptations of his novels. In the beginning of August, Variety announced a contract between the Bosworth Company and Jack London to produce film versions of London's novels. The first release would be The Sea Wolf. The Balboa company would advertise that they would be the first to release the film and announced their own version of The Sea Wolf and several other adaptations of London's works. In an article in Motion Picture News in which Hobart Bosworth stated the production would be ready by October 1 and there is no reason to doubt the contract between Bosworth and London. The publication received a telegram from Jack London confirmed that Balboa's contract had lapsed because of a failure to produce four films by the stipulated date. London also stated that the first film had not even been completed by this point. When the matter was taken to court, the federal judge in Los Angeles refused to grant an injunction on Balboa's three reel version of the film and H. M. Horkheimer was considering suing for damages by Bosworth. The judge allowed the case to be re-opened and the Authors' League of America announced a desire to take it to the United States Supreme Court if necessary. London would win and the case would influence the United States Congress to change the copyright law in the writer's favor.

References

Bibliography

1913 establishments in California
1918 disestablishments in California
American companies established in 1913
Defunct companies based in Greater Los Angeles
Entertainment companies based in California
Entertainment companies established in 1913
Film production companies of the United States
History of Long Beach, California
Mass media companies established in 1913
Mass media companies disestablished in 1918
American companies disestablished in 1918